The Web Science Trust (WST) is a UK Charitable Trust with the aim of supporting the global development of Web science. It was originally started in 2006 as a joint effort between MIT and University of Southampton to formalise the social and technical aspects of the World Wide Web. The trust coordinates a set of international "WSTNet Laboratories" that include academic research groups in the emerging area of Web science.

It was first announced at MIT on 2 November 2006 as the Web Science Research Initiative (WSRI), changing its name in 2009 to the Web Science Trust. Tim Berners-Lee originally led this program, now run by a Board of Trustees, which aims to attract government and private funds to support their many activities. The Web Science Trust supports curriculum development in universities and research institutions to train future generations of Web Scientists. Given the similarities between Web Science and Information Science, Web Science overlaps with the interests of the ISchool movement, particularly in the United States, but focuses more specifically on the Web itself. The annual Web Science conference brings together participants from many fields including those studying both the social and the computational aspects of the World Wide Web.

Areas of interest include:
 Social networks
 Social machine
 Collaboration
 Understanding online community
 Analyzing the human interactions inherent in social media
 Web observatories
 Developing "accountability" and other mechanisms for enhancing privacy and trust on the Web.

Key personnel 
Directors/trustees
 Wendy Hall (managing director)
 Nigel Shadbolt
 James Hendler
 Noshir Contractor
 JP Rangaswami (chairman)
 George Metakides
 Steffen Staab
 Anni Rowland-Campbell
 Bill Thompson
 Jennifer Zhu Scott

Fellows
 Tim Berners-Lee (also Founding Director)
 Sir John Taylor

Patron
 Rennie Fritchie, Baroness Fritchie

Conferences 
The first Web Science conference (WebSci09: Society on Line) was sponsored in part by WSRI and was held in Greece in March 2009. The conference had over 300 registrants from a number of fields including computing, social science, law, economics, philosophy, psychology. The conference has since continued as a yearly event. The first fully virtual Web Science conference was held in July 2020 as a result of travel restrictions arising from the COVID-19 pandemic.

See also 
 List of I-Schools
 World Wide Web
 Webometrics
 Web Engineering

Bibliography 

 Web Science: Studying the Internet to Protect Our Future, an article by Tim Berners-Lee.

References

External links 
 
 Press release
 Audio: Web Science: A Conversation with the Inventor of the Web

History of computing in the United Kingdom
Information technology organisations based in the United Kingdom
Massachusetts Institute of Technology
Science and technology in Hampshire
University of Southampton
Web science
2006 establishments in England